Dating the Era of Lord Ram is an English language book published in 2004 by Rupa & Co, written by Pushkar Bhatnagar. The book is about the life of Rama, a deity in Hinduism.

Content 
According to Sage Valmiki, when Lord Ram was born, the sun was in Aries, the moon was in Cancer, Jupiter and the moon were both in Libra, Venus was in Pisces, and Mars was in Capricorn. Additionally, it was the ninth day of the moon's ascending phase in the lunar month of Chaitra. With the use of a powerful piece of software, the two slides on the book's cover show that on January 10, 5114 B.C., these particular astral conditions were present in the sky. This book uses Western scientific progress to demonstrate how old the East is.

Controversy 
Historians had questioned and asked for evidence to prove the existence of "Lord Ram", professor of Allahabad University R. P. Tripathi said historical characters needs solid evidence to justify the myths, former chairman of the Indian Council of Historical Research S Setter said that there is no such evidence can prove the existence of lord Ram and called "Lord Ram is myth".

In art and culture
The makers of the 2022 film Ram Setu makes mentions of the book.

References

External links
Dating the Era of Lord Ram

Rupa Publications books
21st-century Indian books
Hinduism studies books